Tomie (富江, 富枝, とみえ) is both a surname and a Japanese feminine given name. Notable people with the name include:

Surname
, Japanese Middle-distance running
, Japanese game director, writer of Spike Chunsoft's affiliation

Given name
Tomie Arai (born 1949), Japanese American artist and community activist
, former female international table tennis from Japan
, Japanese actress and voice actress
Tomie Kono Knudsen (1929 – 1998), a Tenrikyo minister
Tomie Nishimura (born 1933), former international table tennis player from Japan
, Japanese-Brazilian visual artist
, Japanese novelist

Fictional Character(s)
Tomie Kawakami, a fictional character from Tomie by Junji Ito

Japanese-language surnames
Japanese feminine given names